Ane Is Missing is a 2020 Spanish drama film directed by David Pérez Sañudo, starring Patricia López Arnaiz and Mikel Losada.

The film won the Goya Award for Best Actress (López Arnaiz), along with Best New Actress for Jone Laspiur and Best Adapted Screenplay for Pérez Sañudo and Marina Parés Pulido, from a total of five nominations, at the 35th Goya Awards. At the 8th Feroz Awards, the film won Best Actress, from a total of three nominations.

Plot 
Lide, a young mother, works as a security guard for an engineering project that has part of her community up in arms. This drama pales into comparison when, one day, she gets up to find that her daughter Ane is not in the house, nor has her bed been slept in.

Neither the film's characters nor the viewer sees Ane and the heightened tension in the community seems to magnify the void she has left behind. As Lide turns to her ex-partner Fernando (Mikel Losada), Ane’s father, for help, it becomes apparent that she is somehow afraid of this unseen daughter.

Cast
 Patricia López Arnaiz as Lide
 Mikel Losada as Fernando
 Aia Kruse as Leire
 Luis Callejo as Eneko
 Mariana Cordero as Antonia
 David Blanka as Peio
 Jone Laspiur as Ane

Awards

References

External links
 
 

2020 films
2020s Spanish-language films
Spanish drama films
2020 drama films
2020s Spanish films
2020 directorial debut films
Basque-language films